When AIDS Was Funny is a 2015 short documentary film by Scott Calonico. The film plays controversial audio of the White House's acting press spokesman, Larry Speakes, responding to questions on the escalating AIDS epidemic by journalist Lester Kinsolving. The audio recordings are from several of the Reagan administration's press conferences in the 1980s. The audio is juxtaposed with images of AIDS patients at Seattle's Bailey-Boushay House in the 1990s.

1982 exchange
The controversial dismissal of the growing AIDS epidemic is heard in the film through a series of press conferences in the 1980s, such as this 1982 exchange between Speakes and Kinsolving:

References

2015 short documentary films
HIV/AIDS